Hope & Pen-y-ffordd railway station was a station in Penyffordd, Flintshire, Wales. The station was opened on 14 August 1849 and closed on 30 April 1962. The last Station Master/Goods Agent was Mr T G C Jones who transferred to Deganwy on closure.

References

Further reading

Disused railway stations in Flintshire
Railway stations in Great Britain opened in 1849
Railway stations in Great Britain closed in 1962
Former London and North Western Railway stations